G. Mahesh Babu Entertainment is an Indian film production company established by actor Mahesh Babu.

Film production

References

External links
 Mahesh Babu Entertainment Pvt. Ltd on YouTube

Film production companies based in Hyderabad, India
Indian companies established in 2014
2014 establishments in Andhra Pradesh